al-Aamrat (Arabic: العمرات) is a Syrian village in the Qatana District of the Rif Dimashq Governorate. According to the Syria Central Bureau of Statistics (CBS), al-Aamrat had a population of 427 in the 2004 census.

References

External links

Populated places in Qatana District